Apatolichas is an extinct genus from a well-known class of fossil marine arthropods, the trilobites. It lived during the later part of the Arenig stage of the Ordovician Period, approximately 478 to 471 million years ago.

References

Ordovician trilobites of North America
Extinct animals of North America
Paleozoic life of Newfoundland and Labrador